The 1976 NCAA Division I men's ice hockey tournament was the culmination of the 1975–76 NCAA Division I men's ice hockey season, the 29th such tournament in NCAA history. It was held between March 25 and 27, 1976, and concluded with Minnesota defeating Michigan Tech 6-4. All games were played at the University of Denver Arena in Denver, Colorado.

Qualifying teams
Four teams qualified for the tournament, two each from the eastern and western regions. The ECAC tournament champion and the two WCHA tournament co-champions received automatic bids into the tournament. An at-large bid was offered to a second eastern team based upon both their ECAC tournament finish as well as their regular season record.

Format
The ECAC champion was seeded as the top eastern team while the WCHA co-champion with the better regular season record was given the top western seed. The second eastern seed was slotted to play the top western seed and vice versa. All games were played at the University of Denver Arena. All matches were Single-game eliminations with the semifinal winners advancing to the national championship game and the losers playing in a consolation game.

Bracket

Note: * denotes overtime period(s)

Semifinal

(W1) Michigan Tech vs. (E2) Brown

(E1) Boston University vs. (W2) Minnesota

Third-place game

(E1) Boston University vs. (E2) Brown

National Championship

(W1) Michigan Tech vs. (W2) Minnesota

All-Tournament team
None Selected

Most Outstanding Player(s)
Tom Vannelli

References

Tournament
NCAA Division I men's ice hockey tournament
NCAA Division I Men's Ice Hockey Tournament
NCAA Division I Men's Ice Hockey Tournament
1970s in Denver
Ice hockey competitions in Denver